These hits topped the Dutch Top 40 in 1961.

See also
1961 in music

References

1961 in the Netherlands
1961 record charts
1961